"School Is Out" is a song written by Gary U.S. Bonds and Gene Barge and performed by Bonds.  It reached #5 on the U.S. pop chart and #12 on the U.S. R&B chart in 1961.  It was featured on his 1961 album Dance 'Til Quarter to Three with U. S. Bonds.

The song ranked #54 on Billboard magazine's Top 100 singles of 1961.

The song is referenced in the Ernie Mareska song "Shout, Shout" (Knock Yourself Out) (1962)

Other versions
Ray Ellis and His Orchestra released a version of the song on their 1961 album Ray Ellis Plays the Top 20.
Ry Cooder released a version of the song on his 1977 album Show Time.
Tonio K. released a version of the song on his 1981 EP School Is Out.

References

1961 songs
1961 singles
Gary U.S. Bonds songs
Ry Cooder songs
Songs written by Gene Barge